Sven Zellner (born December 20, 1977) is a German photographer, camera operator and documentary filmmaker.

Life 
Zellner was born on December 20, 1977 in Eckernförde, Schleswig-Holstein, Germany.

From October 2002 to February 2010, he studied camera in the cinema and television film department at the University of Television and Film Munich. He has been a lecturer there since 2009.

Filmography (selection) 

 2010: Die Bumblebee (camera)
 2012: Preis des Goldes (documentary film: director, camera, editor)
 2015: Don't Look at Me That Way (cinematography)
 2020: Walchensee Forever (documentary: cinematography)
 2020: Black Milk (cinematography, production)

Awards (selection) 

 1995: Second prize at the „BBC Young Wildlife Photographer of the Year“
 2000: Second prize in the category Landschaft at the „BG Wildlife Photographer of the Year“
 2009: Third prize for Tsogzol – Goldgräber in der Mongolei (later Preis des Goldes) at the Filmfest München at the Dokumentarfilmwettbewerb by Bayerischer Rundfunk and Telepool
 2012: ARTE-Dokumentarfilmpreis for his film Preis des Goldes
 2013: Second prize for Wounded Places at the Filmfest München at the Dokumentarfilmwettbewerb by Bayerischer Rundfunk and Global Screen
 2015: Honorable Mention of the Manuel Rivera-Ortiz Foundation for Documentary Photography and Film

Exhibitions 

 2012 „NINJAS“ Hochschule für Fernsehen und Film München
 2013 „NINJAS“ Deutsche Botschaft in Ulaanbaatar
 2014 „Mongolian Disco“ Leica Fotografie International Galerie, Hamburg
 2014 „Mongolian Disco“, Radialsystem V (Crossing Identities – Beginners, Experts, Hybrids Urban Nomads // Mongol Citizens // Festival Berlin 2014)
 2015 „Mongolian Disco“, German House, UN Plaza, New York (DAAD-Ausstellung: WESTALGIA: NOSTALGIA FOR THE WEST)

Publications 

 Süddeutsche Zeitung Nr. 133 „Es darf wehtun“ Samstag/Sonntag 11./12. June 2016
 GEO „Zukunft auf Eis“ February 2016
 Delayed Gratification „slowing pains“ January 2016
 Das Magazin „Mongole mit Kohle“ No 10 (August 3–March 14, 2014) (weekly supplement from Tagesanzeiger, Basler Zeitung, Berner Zeitung and the federal government).
 GEO International „Ulan-Bator“ May 2014
 Leica Fotografie International „Mongolen Disko“ February 2014
 Terra Mater „Goldrausch im Wilden Osten“ December 2012
 VIEW „Knallharte Träumer“ April 2014
 Nikon Pro „Risking life and limb“ April 2015

External links 

 Official website
 Sven Zeller on IMDb
 Sven Zeller on filmportal.de
 Literature from and about Sven Zeller in the German National Library

References 

1977 births
Living people